Harald Hansen (18 February 1890 – 30 June 1967) was a Danish painter. His work was part of the painting event in the art competition at the 1932 Summer Olympics.

References

1890 births
1967 deaths
20th-century Danish painters
Danish male painters
Olympic competitors in art competitions
People from Copenhagen
20th-century Danish male artists